The 1985–1988 Rugby League World Cup (sometimes shortened to 1988 Rugby League World Cup) was the ninth Rugby League World Cup tournament held and saw yet another change of format with competition stretched to cover almost three years (1985 to 1988). The national rugby league teams of Australia, France, Great Britain, New Zealand and Papua New Guinea played each other on a home and away basis. These matches were fitted into the normal international programme of three-match test series between the nations, with a pre-designated match from each series counting as the world cup fixture. The tournament culminated in the 1988 Rugby League World Cup Final.

The competition was further altered by the addition of a new nation, Papua New Guinea. The Kumuls performed creditably, particularly when playing in the front of their fiercely patriotic home crowd, while France were unable to fulfil their 1987 tour of Australasia due to financial difficulties, and had to forfeit away fixtures against Australia, New Zealand and Papua New Guinea.

At the end of four years, Australia finished top of the table, and, through a victory over Great Britain in Christchurch, the Kiwis qualified to join them in the final.

Despite finishing top of the table, poor international attendances since the mid-1970s (since 1974, the Kangaroos had only lost one test series, to France in 1978) meant the Australians declined to host the final, and asked New Zealand Rugby League to host the World Cup Final at Eden Park in Auckland; Cup organisers and New Zealand officials accepted this request.

In front of a record New Zealand attendance of over 47,000 the Kiwis lost 25–12 to the Australians.

Venues

Final 
The World Cup Final was held at Eden Park in Auckland, New Zealand.

Results

1985

1986 

This match was the third Test of the 1986 Kangaroo tour of Great Britain and France's Ashes series.

This was the final Test match of the 1986 Kangaroo tour of Great Britain and France.

1987

1988 

The victory lifted Great Britain above New Zealand into second place on the World Cup table on eight points – one ahead of the Kiwis.

This was the end of a 15-match winning streak for the Australians, and Great Britain's first Test victory over the Kangaroos since their 18–14 win at Odsal during the 1978 Kangaroo tour, as well as their first win in Australia for 18 years. It also put Great Britain on top of the World Cup points table.

The last group stage match for both teams turned out to be a sudden death battle for a spot in the final. For New Zealand nothing less than a win would get them to the Final while Great Britain only needed a draw. It was also the last Test match of the 1988 Great Britain Lions tour. The Kiwis victory meant they qualified to face Australia in the final at Eden Park, Auckland.

Australia's 62-point win set a new record for largest winning margin in international rugby league. Winger Michael O'Connor also set a new record for most points scored by an individual in international rugby league. The sellout crowd of 11,685 also set a ground attendance record at Wagga Wagga's Eric Weissel Oval.

Tournament standings

World Cup Final 

The 1985–1988 Rugby League World Cup saw New Zealand play Australia in the World Cup final, the culmination of four years of competition. The Final was played at the spiritual home of rugby union in New Zealand, Auckland's Eden Park. It was the first time that rugby league had been played at the ground since 1919. The final attracted the highest ever crowd for a rugby league match in New Zealand of 47,363 (only 672 less than had attended the 1987 Rugby World Cup Final at the venue). Australia had won the right to host the final, but in the interests of promoting the game, and because attendances for internationals played in Australia had been dwindling for over a decade due to the Kangaroos dominance, the ARL agreed to move the game to New Zealand. Prior to kick-off Graham Brazier performed the New Zealand national anthem.

Despite Australia's successful Ashes defence against Great Britain earlier in the year, the inexperience of the Australian World Cup Final team (and because NZ had defeated Australia in their previous encounter in a one-off test in Brisbane in 1987), saw the hosts actually go into the match as favourites in the eyes of many critics. However, the Wally Lewis led Kangaroos, boasting veteran test players Garry Jack, Dale Shearer, Michael O'Connor, Steve Roach, Paul Dunn, Wayne Pearce, and Terry Lamb, along with 1986 Kangaroos Ben Elias and Paul Sironen, mixed with newer international players Mark McGaw, Allan Langer, Gavin Miller, Andrew Farrar and David Gillespie, triumphed over the ill-disciplined Kiwis, who at least made sure the victorious Australians were bloodied and bruised for their victory lap. For the Kiwis, the Iro brothers Tony and Kevin, Gary Freeman, Clayton Friend, Mark Graham, Adrian Shelford, Kurt Sorensen and captain Dean Bell dished out the punishment.

Despite Queensland having won the State of Origin series 3–0 over New South Wales earlier in the year, the Maroons only supplied three of Australia's 15 players for the World Cup Final. Captain Wally Lewis (who broke his right forearm in the 15th minute of the game while tackling Tony Iro), Dale Shearer and Allan Langer. Lewis later claimed that it was the same as had been the case since Origin started in 1980, Qld wins the series but it was mainly NSW players picked for Australia.

Try scorers 
8

  Michael O'Connor

6

  Dale Shearer

5

  Garry Jack
  Wally Lewis

4

  Alan Langer
  Shaun Edwards
  Henderson Gill
  Mike Gregory
  Ellery Hanley
  Garry Schofield
  Kevin Iro
  Dairi Kovae

3

  Shane Horo
  Hugh McGahan
  Darrell Williams

2

  Noel Cleal
  Brett Kenny
  Les Kiss
  Bob Lindner
  Mal Meninga
  Gavin Miller
  Gene Miles
  David Fraisse
  Phil Ford
  Joe Lydon
  Paul Medley
  Gary Freeman
  Clayton Friend
  Mark Graham
  Gary Mercer
  Wayne Wallace
  Darius Haili
  Bal Numapo

1

  Sam Backo
  Greg Conescu
  Tony Currie
  Steve Folkes
  Wally Fullerton-Smith
  Des Hasler
  Chris Mortimer
  Bryan Niebling
  Steve Roach
  Peter Sterling
  Gilles Dumas
  Cyril Pons
  Hugues Ratier
  Mark Forster
  Andy Goodway
  Andy Gregory
  David Hulme
  Paul Loughlin
  Martin Offiah
  David Stephenson
  Peter Brown
  Tony Iro
  Gary Kemble
  A'au James Leuluai
  Joe Ropati
  Adrian Shelford
  Kurt Sorensen
  Bobby Ako
  Lauta Atoi
  Arnold Krewanty
  Michael Matmillo
  Mea Morea
  Isaac Rop

References

External links 
 1985–1988 World Cup at rlwc08.com
 1985–1988 World Cup at rlhalloffame.org.uk
 1985–1988 World Cup at rugbyleagueproject.com
 1985–1988 World Cup data at hunterlink.net.au
 1985–1988 World Cup at 188-rugby-league.co.uk